Alfred A. Bianchi (March 26, 1932 – October 28, 2019) was an American professional basketball player, coach, general manager, consultant, and scout.

Early years
Nicknamed "Blinky", he attended P.S. 4 elementary school and graduated from Long Island City High School in 1950. A 1954 graduate of Bowling Green State University, he was voted to the "All-Ohio Team" and received honorable mention as a basketball All-American.  He served in the U.S. Army Medical Corps from 1954 to 1956.

Professional playing career
Starting in 1956, Bianchi played for the Syracuse Nationals of the NBA.  He moved with the team to Philadelphia when it became the 76ers for the 1963–64 season.  He was one of the last proponents in the NBA of the two-handed set shot.

Coaching career
On May 1, 1966, Bianchi was selected by the Chicago Bulls in the NBA expansion draft but never played in a game for them and retired as a player.  He then became assistant coach under former teammate Johnny "Red" Kerr, head coach of the Bulls.  After a year in Chicago, he was hired as head coach of the expansion team Seattle SuperSonics, compiling a 53–111 record for the new NBA franchise.

He then became coach and general manager of the Washington Caps/Virginia Squires of the American Basketball Association from 1969 through 1975. In 1971, he won ABA Coach of the Year honors for guiding the Squires to the ABA's Eastern Division championship with a record of 55–29 (.655).  The Squires then lost to the New York Nets in the Eastern Division finals, and the Indiana Pacers defeated the Nets in the ABA Finals. He finished his coaching career with a 283–392 record.

Front office
In 1976, he re-entered the NBA to work for head coach John MacLeod as assistant coach for the Phoenix Suns, from 1976–1987, a tenure highlighted by the Suns' legendary triple-overtime loss to the Boston Celtics in Game 4 of the NBA finals, won by the Celtics 4 games to 2.

He then moved to the front office as general manager for the New York Knicks from 1987 to 1991. Returning to Phoenix in 1991, he scouted college players for the Suns. In 2004, he became a consultant-scout for the Golden State Warriors, where he stayed through the 2008–09 season.

In September 2007, he was inducted into the New York City Basketball Hall of Fame as a player, by the New York City Athletic Club.

Bianchi lived and worked as a consultant in Phoenix.

He was inducted into the Ohio Basketball Hall of Fame at the 11th Annual Ceremony on May 21, 2016 in Columbus.

Death
Bianchi died on October 28, 2019 in Phoenix, Arizona from congestive heart failure at the age of 87.

See also 
 List of NBA players who have spent their entire career with one franchise

References

External links
 

 Bianchi coaching record at BasketballReference.com

1932 births
2019 deaths
American men's basketball players
Basketball coaches from New York (state)
Basketball players from New York City
Bowling Green Falcons men's basketball players
Chicago Bulls assistant coaches
Chicago Bulls expansion draft picks
Guards (basketball)
Minneapolis Lakers draft picks
Philadelphia 76ers players
Phoenix Suns assistant coaches
Seattle SuperSonics head coaches
Sportspeople from Queens, New York
Syracuse Nationals players
Virginia Squires coaches
Virginia Squires executives
Washington Caps coaches